The Embassy of the Republic of South Africa in Moscow is the diplomatic mission of South Africa in the Russian Federation. It is located at Building 9, 1 Granatny Lane in the Presnensky District of Moscow.

See also 
 Russia–South Africa relations
 Diplomatic missions in Russia

References

External links 
  Embassy of South Africa in Moscow

Russia–South Africa relations
South Africa
Moscow